Pavel Gatskiy (born 1 January 1991) is a Kazakhstani road and track cyclist. He competed in the points race event at the 2013 UCI Track Cycling World Championships.

Major results

2012
 2nd  Madison, Asian Track Championships (with Artyom Zakharov)
2014
 2nd  Madison, Asian Track Championships (with Nikita Panassenko)
 5th Road race, National Road Championships
 9th Overall Tour of China I
2015
 4th Road race, National Road Championships
 4th Overall Bałtyk–Karkonosze Tour
2018
 10th Grand Prix Side

References

External links
 
 

1991 births
Living people
Kazakhstani track cyclists
Kazakhstani male cyclists
People from Pavlodar
20th-century Kazakhstani people
21st-century Kazakhstani people